is a Japanese dancer and actor. He is the youngest member of Exile and also the leader of the Japanese group Fantastics from Exile Tribe.

Life and career 
In 2009, Taiki got interested in dancing due to his mother's invitation to watch "Exile Live Tour 2009 The Monster", he then joined Tokyo's EXPG.

In 2011, he started his activities as both an actor and a back dancer for Generations from Exile Tribe.

In February 2014, he participated in "Exile Performer Battle Audition" and in April of the same year he became one of five people who passed the final audition to join Exile as performers.

In April 2015, he appeared in NTV's drama "Wild Heroes", followed by NTV's drama "High & Low The Story Of S.W.O.R.D." in October of the same year.

On December 29, 2016, he was announced as a member and leader (alongside Exile's member Sekai) of the unit Fantastics from Exile Tribe which released their major debut single "Over Drive" on December 5, 2018.

Filmography

Movies

Short films

TV Dramas

Stage

Advertisements

TV Shows

Music Videos

Voice Acting

References

External links 

 EXILE Official Site
 FANTASTICS Official Site
 Official Twitter @taiki__official

1995 births
Living people
Japanese male dancers
People from Saitama Prefecture
Actors from Saitama Prefecture
LDH (company) artists
21st-century dancers
21st-century Japanese male actors